Bacchisa frontalis is a species of beetle in the family Cerambycidae. It was described by Gahan in 1895. It is known from Myanmar.

References

F
Beetles described in 1895